Steven L. Olsonoski (born July 3, 1953), better known by the ring name Steve O, is a retired American professional wrestler from Minnesota. He was considered one of the top junior heavyweights during the 1980s.

Professional wrestling career 
Steve Olsonoski, purportedly from Edina, Minnesota, began his wrestling career in the late 1970s in the American Wrestling Association. He was often described as an up-and-coming star. He briefly teamed with Evan Johnson in the AWA, but his career progressed substantially as a solo wrestler.  He wrestled off and on for the AWA through the 1980s.

Olsonoski, also known as Steve O., also wrestled for the National Wrestling Alliance in the early 1980s in the Georgia Championship Wrestling territory.  While in Georgia he won the NWA Georgia Junior Heavyweight Championship, the NWA National Heavyweight Championship, the NWA National Tag Team Championship and twice won the NWA National Television Championship. He later returned to work for Verne Gagne in the American Wrestling Association.

Championships and accomplishments 
American Wrestling Association
AWA Rookie of the Year Award (1978)
Georgia Championship Wrestling
NWA Georgia Junior Heavyweight Championship (1 time)
NWA Georgia Television Championship (2 times)
NWA National Heavyweight Championship (1 time)
NWA National Tag Team Championship (1 time) – with Ted DiBiase
Pro Wrestling Illustrated
PWI ranked him #249 of the top 500 singles wrestlers in the PWI 500 in 1991
Pro Wrestling This Week
Wrestler of the Week (March 20–26, 1988) tied with Greg Gagne

References

External links 
Steve O at Cagematch.net
Steve O at Wrestlingdata.com

American male professional wrestlers
Living people
Professional wrestlers from Minnesota
1953 births
20th-century professional wrestlers
NWA National Heavyweight Champions
NWA Georgia Junior Heavyweight Champions
NWA National Television Champions
NWA National Tag Team Champions